Admiral (Ret.) Mykhailo Bronislavovych Yezhel is the former Minister of Defence of Ukraine (from 2010 to 2012) and a former Commander of the Ukrainian Navy (from 2001 to 2003).

Biography
Mykhailo Yezhel was born on October 19, 1952 in a small village of Sloboda-Yaltushkivska, Bar Raion, Vinnytsia Oblast, in the Ukrainian SSR of the Soviet Union.

In 1970 he completed 10th grade in a Republican specialized boarding school in Kyiv and went on military career. Having served in the Pacific Fleet of the Soviet Navy from 1975 till 1993, Yezhel acquired citizenship of the newly independent Ukraine and joined its Navy from the very beginning of its foundation.

From August 20, 2001 until April 25, 2003 he served as commander-in-chief of the Ukrainian Navy. He retired in October 2003.

From March 11, 2010 until February 8, 2012 he served as the Minister of Defence of Ukraine. 
According to Ukrayinska Pravda he had been forced to resign "for failure to plan for army reform". On 24 February 2012 Yezhel was appointed an adviser to Ukrainian President Viktor Yanukovych.

From 2013 until 2015 Yezhel was Ambassador of Ukraine to Belarus.

In March 2016 Mykhailo Yezhel together with (his successor as Minister of Defence) Pavlo Lebedyev were placed on a wanted list by Ukrainian authorities on suspicion of criminal activities and desertion. Yezhel was specifically wanted in relation to the sale of two Tu-95MS bombers to Russia during his period as defense minister. In April 2015 Belarus refused to respond to the Ukrainian request as to whether Yezhel lived in Minsk. Yezhel than confirmed that he and his family did live in Belarus, and that he will only return to Ukraine after a withdraw of the criminal charges. He was granted refugee status in Belarus in July 2018.

References

External links
 Biography (In Ukrainian)

Ukrainian admirals
Soviet Navy personnel
Living people
1952 births
People from Vinnytsia Oblast
Naval commanders of Ukraine
Defence ministers of Ukraine
Ambassadors of Ukraine to Belarus
Recipients of the Order of Bohdan Khmelnytsky, 3rd class
Fugitives wanted by Ukraine